The Edge of Tomorrow is a collection of short science fiction stories and science essays by Isaac Asimov, published by Tor Books in July 1985.

Contents

Foreword by Ben Bova
Introduction by Isaac Asimov
"Unique Is Where You Find It" (story)
"The Eureka Phenomenon" (essay)
"The Feeling of Power" (story)
"The Comet That Wasn't" (essay)
"Found!" (story)
"Twinkle, Twinkle, Microwaves" (essay)
"Pâté de Foie Gras" (story)
"The Bridge of the Gods" (essay)
"Belief" (story)
"Euclid's Fifth" (essay)
"The Plane Truth" (essay)
"The Billiard Ball" (story)
"The Winds of Change" (story)
"The Figure of the Fastest" (essay)
"The Dead Past" (story)
"The Fateful Lightning (essay)
"Breeds There a Man...?" (story)
"The Man Who Massed the Earth" (essay)
"Nightfall (story)
"The Planet That Wasn't" (essay)
"The Ugly Little Boy" (story)
"The Three Who Died Too Soon" (essay)
"The Last Question" (story)
"The Nobel Prize That Wasn't" (essay)

External links

1985 short story collections
Science fiction short story collections by Isaac Asimov